The Palawan striped babbler (Zosterornis hypogrammicus) is a species of bird in the family Zosteropidae. It is endemic to the Philippines, where it is only found in Palawan.

Its natural habitat is tropical moist montane forest. It is threatened by habitat loss.

Description 
EBird describes the bird as "A fairly small bird of mid-elevation montane forest on Panay. Dark brown above and heavily streaked with black below, with base color blending from white on the throat to buffy on the lower belly. Note the white face edged with black and the thin black stripe behind the eye. Often found in mixed-species flocks. Somewhat similar to Stripe-sided and Visayan Rhabdornises, but smaller, and lacks the broad black band through the eye. Voice includes a loud staccato trill." They are generally observed to forage close to the ground.

It is the most distinctive among the four striped babblers (others being the Luzon striped babbler, the Panay striped babbler and the Negros striped babbler), which are generally plain brown versus the Palawan striped babbler's olive yellow markings.

Habitat and Conservation Status 
This species is known from primary montane mossy forest from 1,000 m to 2,000 m. It is only found on three mountains, namely Mount Mantalingajan, Mt. Victoria and Mt. Borangbato. 

Due to its extremely limited range, IUCN has assessed this bird as least concern. This species' main threat is habitat loss with wholesale clearance of forest habitats as a result of logging, agricultural conversion and mining activities occurring within the range.

References

Collar, N. J. & Robson, C. 2007. Family Timaliidae (Babblers)  pp. 70 – 291 in; del Hoyo, J., Elliott, A. & Christie, D.A. eds. Handbook of the Birds of the World, Vol. 12. Picathartes to Tits and Chickadees. Lynx Edicions, Barcelona.

Palawan striped babbler
Birds of Palawan
Birds described in 1961
Taxonomy articles created by Polbot